Raccoon Township is one of thirteen townships in Parke County, Indiana, United States. At the 2010 census, its population was 659 and it had 345 housing units.

History
Raccoon Township took its name from the Big and Little Raccoon creeks.

The Bridgeton Covered Bridge, Bridgeton Historic District, Conley's Ford Covered Bridge, Jeffries Ford Covered Bridge and Nevins Covered Bridge are listed on the National Register of Historic Places.

Geography

Unincorporated towns
 Bridgeton at 
 Catlin at 
 Diamond at 
 Minshall at 
 Smockville at 
 Snow Hill at 
 Superior at 
(This list is based on USGS data and may include former settlements.)

Extinct towns
 Walton at 
(These towns are listed as "historical" by the USGS.)

Cemeteries
The township contains five cemeteries: Brunot, Clear Run, Denman, Hartmans and Webster.

School districts
 Southwest Parke Community School Corporation

Political districts
 State House District 42
 State Senate District 38

References

 
 United States Census Bureau 2009 TIGER/Line Shapefiles
 IndianaMap

External links
 Indiana Township Association
 United Township Association of Indiana
 City-Data.com page for Raccoon Township

Townships in Parke County, Indiana
Townships in Indiana